This is a list of newspapers published in Tibet.

Newspapers currently published in Tibet 
Economic Daily News
Outlook Tibet
Tibet Daily
Tibet Times

Newspapers that have ceased publication in Tibet
 Tibet Mirror
 Tibet Vernacular Paper
Lhasa Evening Post

See also
 Media of the People's Republic of China
 List of newspapers in the People's Republic of China

Tibet
Mass media in Tibet

Newspapers